Farzaneh Taidi (also spelled Ta'yidi or Tayidi, 1945 – March 23, 2020) was an Iranian theater and film actress.  After studying theater and acting in Los Angeles, she debuted in the controversial film, Hashtoumine Rooze Haffteh (literally: The Eighth Day of the Week), one of the first Iranian films to center on a female protagonist. For her role in this film she won a Seppas award for "Best Actress" at the Tehran International Film Festival.

Films

References

External links
Official website

1945 births
2020 deaths
People from Tehran
People from London
Actresses from Tehran
Iranian film actresses
Iranian stage actresses
20th-century Iranian actresses